Melk Abbey is a Benedictine abbey above the town of Melk, Lower Austria, Austria, on a rocky outcrop overlooking the Danube river, adjoining the Wachau valley. The abbey contains the tomb of Saint Coloman of Stockerau and the remains of several members of the House of Babenberg, Austria's first ruling dynasty.

History
The abbey was founded in 1089 when Leopold II, Margrave of Austria gave one of his castles to Benedictine monks from Lambach Abbey. A monastic school, the Stiftsgymnasium Melk, was founded in the twelfth century, and the monastic library soon became renowned for its extensive manuscript collection. The monastery's scriptorium was also a major site for the production of manuscripts. In the fifteenth century the abbey became the centre of the Melk Reform movement which reinvigorated the monastic life of Austria and Southern Germany.

Today's Baroque abbey was built between 1702 and 1736 to designs by Jakob Prandtauer. Particularly noteworthy are the abbey church with frescos by Johann Michael Rottmayr and the library with countless medieval manuscripts, including a famed collection of musical manuscripts, and frescos by Paul Troger.

Due to its fame and academic stature, Melk managed to escape dissolution under Emperor Joseph II when many other Austrian abbeys were seized and dissolved between 1780 and 1790. The abbey managed to survive other threats to its existence during the Napoleonic Wars, and also in the period following the Anschluss in 1938, when the school and a large part of the abbey were confiscated by the state.

The school was returned to the abbey after the Second World War and now serves nearly 900 pupils of both sexes.

Since 1625 the abbey has been a member of the Austrian Congregation, now within the Benedictine Confederation.

In his novel The Name of the Rose, Umberto Eco named one of the protagonists  "Adso of Melk" as a tribute to the abbey and its famous library.

Among its alumni was the nineteenth-century Austrian dramatist and short-story writer, Friedrich Halm.

Melk Abbey is also the metaphorical climax ("a peak in a mountain range of discovery") of Patrick Leigh Fermor's autobiographical account of his walking tour across pre-WW II Europe in A Time of Gifts, which includes a description of the abbey at that time. 

The abbey is part of Wachau Cultural Landscape, a World Heritage Site.

Restoration efforts
The first fire at Melk Abbey and its invaluable library was in 1297. This left the structures destroyed.   This fire, plague and famine led to the “Melk Reform” movement in the early fifteenth century. Most of the manuscripts Melk is famous for housing were saved by Monks. During the 1683 Turkish invasion, the Melk Abbey also suffered devastation.
 

The abbey that stands today, built in 1702, caught fire in 1974. This second fire marred the ornamented rooms and damaged the interior and its art,  leading to its restoration from 1978 to 1995.  The nave of the abbey was a part of the restoration. Eight pounds of gold bullion was used to restore the statues and altars. The restoration process also focused on the church’s frescoes and brown marble columns. The Marble Hall, a popular guest attraction, was also restored during this period. These restoration efforts leave the abbey similar to its 1740 grandeur. 

The parchment, which had been subsequently recycled into the binding of a much later book, has been dated to around 1300; this is nearly 200 years earlier than it was previously thought to have been written.

Euro commemorative coin

Melk Abbey was selected as the main motif of a 10 euro collectors' coin: the Austrian Melk Abbey commemorative coin, minted on April 18, 2007. The obverse shows a view up to the façade of the abbey church and its two side wings from a low level. The twin baroque towers and the great dome of the church behind them can be seen. In the lower right corner the coat-of-arms of the Abbey of Melk (the crossed keys of St. Peter) can be seen.

Gallery

References

External links

Churches completed in 1736
Benedictine monasteries in Austria
1089 establishments in Europe
Christian monasteries established in the 11th century
Monasteries in Lower Austria
Baroque architecture in Austria
Tourist attractions in Lower Austria
11th-century establishments in Austria
Melk
Establishments in the Margraviate of Austria